Dufficy is a surname. Notable people with the surname include:

Frank Dufficy (born 1953), British diver
John Dufficy (1901–1969), Australian politician